Visa requirements for Argentine citizens are administrative entry restrictions by the authorities of other states placed on citizens of Argentina.

As of 11 January 2022, Argentine citizens had visa-free or visa on arrival access to 170 countries and territories, according to the Henley Passport Index.

For journeys within South America (except the Guyanas), Argentines do not need to use a passport, as they may use their National Identity Document (DNI).

Visa requirements map

Visa requirements
Visa requirements for holders of normal passports not travelling as journalists:

Argentina is a full member of Mercosur. As such, its citizens enjoy unlimited access to any of the other full members (Brazil, Paraguay, Uruguay) and associated members (Bolivia, Chile, Peru, Colombia, Ecuador) with the right to residence and work, with no requirement other than nationality. Citizens of these nine countries (including Argentina) may apply for the grant of "temporary residence" for up to two years in another country of the bloc. Then, they may apply for "permanent residence" just before the term of their "temporary residence" expires.

Dependent, disputed, or restricted territories

Unrecognized or partially recognized countries

Dependent and autonomous territories

Non-visa restrictions

See also

Visa policy of Argentina
Argentine passport

References and notes
References

Notes

Argentina
Foreign relations of Argentina